Basaluzzo is a comune (municipality) in the Province of Alessandria in the Italian region Piedmont, located about  southeast of Turin and about  southeast of Alessandria.

Basaluzzo borders the following municipalities: Bosco Marengo, Capriata d'Orba, Francavilla Bisio, Fresonara, Novi Ligure, Pasturana, and Predosa.

References

Cities and towns in Piedmont